Phragmatobia placida is a moth in the family Erebidae. It was described by Imre Frivaldszky in 1835. It is found in Albania, Bosnia and Herzegovina, Bulgaria, North Macedonia, Greece, Ukraine, Asia Minor and the Near East.

The wingspan is about 41 mm.

The larvae feed on Plantago and Taraxacum species.

Subspecies
Phragmatobia placida placida
Phragmatobia placida mirzayansi Dubatolov & Zahiri, 2005
Phragmatobia placida unipuncta Amsel, 1935

References

Moths described in 1835
Spilosomina